The Dice Woman is a 1926 American silent action adventure film directed by Eddie Dillon and starring Priscilla Dean. No known prints of it exist, and it is presumed lost.

No longer a Universal contract star in 1926, Dean was in her career's waning years, but was reported to have given an exceptional performance in this film.

Cast
Priscilla Dean - Anita Gray
John Bowers - Hamlin
Gustav von Seyffertitz - Datto of Mandat
Lionel Belmore - Rastillac
Phillips Smalley - Mr. Gray
Malcolm Denny - Satterlee
William J. Humphrey - Ship Captain
George Kuwa - Steward

References

External links

1920s action adventure films
1926 films
American action adventure films
American black-and-white films
American silent feature films
Films based on short fiction
Films directed by Edward Dillon
Lost American films
Producers Distributing Corporation films
1920s American films
Silent action adventure films